Rites is a double album by the Norwegian saxophonist Jan Garbarek, recorded in 1998 and released on the ECM label.

Reception 
The AllMusic review by Thom Jurek stated: "On one collection, listeners get music for prayer, contemplation, and grief, as well as a funky European read of indigenous music for moving to and celebrating. Clearly this is what sets Rites above Garbarek's other recordings, him taking that balance he possessed so early in his career back again and putting it to work in a near-sacred setting".

Track listing
All compositions by Jan Garbarek except as indicated

Disc One:
 "Rites" - 8:29 
 "Where the Rivers Meet" - 7:02 
 "Vast Plain, Clouds" - 5:55 
 "So Mild the Wind, So Meek the Water" - 6:11 
 "Song, Tread Lightly" - 7:45 
 "It's OK to Listen to the Gray Voice" - 6:45 
 "Her Wild Ways" - 6:46

Disc Two:
 "It's High Time" - 3:36 
 "One Ying for Every Yang" - 6:36 
 "Pan" - 6:13 
 "We Are the Stars" - 5:03 
 "The Moon Over Mtatsminda" (Jansug Kakhidze) - 4:02 
 "Malinye" (Don Cherry) - 6:22 
 "The White Clown" - 3:47 
 "Evenly They Danced" - 5:18 
 "Last Rite" - 8:25

Personnel
Jan Garbarek - soprano saxophone, tenor saxophone, synthesizers, sampler, percussion
Rainer Brüninghaus - piano (Disc One tracks 4, 6 & 7), keyboards (Disc One tracks 3 & 6, Disc Two tracks 2 & 7)  
Eberhard Weber - bass  (Disc One tracks 3, 4, 6, & 7, Disc Two tracks 2 & 7)  
Marilyn Mazur - drums (Disc One tracks 3, 4, 6 & 7, Disc Two tracks 2, 6 & 7), percussion (Disc One tracks 2 & 5) 
Tbilisi Symphony Orchestra - conducted by Jansug Kakhidze (Disc Two track 5)
Bugge Wesseltoft -  synthesizer (Disc One track 1, Disc Two tracks 1, 8 & 9), accordion (Disc Two track 6)
Sølvguttene Choir - conducted by Torstein Grythe (Disc Two track 4)

References

1998 albums
ECM Records albums
Jan Garbarek albums
Albums produced by Manfred Eicher